Seven scholars of Jian'an or Chien-an, also translated as the "seven philosophers or masters of Jian'an", were a group of seven Chinese intellectuals of the Eastern Han dynasty. The name was coined by Cao Pi. The Jian'an era was the era from 196–220 during the reign of Emperor Xian. Known as the time of unrest preceding the Three Kingdoms era, the period gained popularity in the East Asian culture.

The seven scholars are Wang Can, Chen Lin, Ruan Yu (阮瑀), Liu Zhen (劉楨), Xu Gan,  (應瑒), and Kong Rong.

Ruan Yu was the father of Ruan Ji, one of the Seven Sages of the Bamboo Grove.

See also
 Jian'an poetry

Jian'an poetry